James Collins (5 February 1801 – 19 June 1868) was an Anglican priest  in Ireland during the 19th century.

Collins was born in County Louth and educated at Trinity College, Dublin. He was the incumbent at Denn, County Cavan and Dean of Killala from 1844 until his death.

Notes

Alumni of Trinity College Dublin
Church of Ireland priests
19th-century Irish Anglican priests
Deans of Killala
1868 deaths
1801 births
People from County Louth